Ronaldo Rodrigues Tavares (born 22 July 1997) is a Portuguese professional footballer who plays for C.F. Estrela da Amadora as a striker.

Club career
Born in Amora (Seixal), Setúbal District, Tavares joined Sporting CP's academy at the age of 16, from local Paio Pires Futebol Clube. He made his professional debut with the former's reserves on 10 January 2016, coming on as a second-half substitute for Rafael Barbosa in a 2–0 away loss against C.D. Feirense in the Segunda Liga.

Tavares scored his first goal in the competition on 20 August 2016, but in a 2–4 home defeat to AD Fafe. In March 2018, he was called by first-team manager Jorge Jesus for a match against FC Viktoria Plzeň in the UEFA Europa League round of 16, but eventually did not leave the bench.

On 23 July 2018, Tavares was loaned to C.D. Cova da Piedade. In the summer of 2019, he cut ties with Sporting and signed with F.C. Penafiel also of the second division.

Club statistics

References

External links

1997 births
Living people
People from Seixal
Portuguese sportspeople of Cape Verdean descent
Black Portuguese sportspeople
Sportspeople from Setúbal District
Portuguese footballers
Association football forwards
Liga Portugal 2 players
Sporting CP B players
C.D. Cova da Piedade players
F.C. Penafiel players
C.F. Estrela da Amadora players
Portugal youth international footballers